Gynaikothrips ficorum, the Cuban laurel thrips, is a species of tube-tailed thrip in the family Phlaeothripidae. It is found in Africa, North America, and Europe. It is widespread around the world because of its host, Ficus.

It was first described by Paul Marchal in 1908 as Phloeothrips ficorum.

In Australia, where it is known as the Fig leaf-rolling thrips, it has been found in New South Wales, the Northern Territory, Queensland, and Western Australia.

References

Further reading

External links
Lucid key factsheet: Gynaikothrips ficorum
Gynaikothrips ficorum: Images at iNaturalist

Phlaeothripidae
Articles created by Qbugbot
Insects described in 1908
Taxa named by Paul Marchal